Suchonica is an extinct genus of chroniosuchid reptiliomorph from upper Permian (upper Tatarian age) deposits of Sukhona Formation of Vologda Region, Russia. It was first named by V. K. Golubev in 1999, from the anterior armor scute (PIN, no. 4611/1). The type species is Suchonica vladimiri.

References 

Permian animals
Chroniosuchians
Fossil taxa described in 1999
Fossils of Russia